Edward H. Lyons (December 22, 1855 – January 17, 1920) was an American businessman, farmer, and politician.

Biography
Born in Athens County, Ohio, Lyons moved with his parents to Wisconsin in 1856.

In 1885, he started a mercantile business in Eden, Fond du Lac County, Wisconsin. From 1903 to 1907, he served as Fond du Lac County treasurer. He then retired from the mercantile business and became involved with the manufacture of lime. Lyons served as president of the Standard Stone & Lime Company and the Badger Pressed Brick Company with the home offices located in Fond du Lac. He lived in Fond du Lac.

From 1909 to 1913, Lyons served in the Wisconsin State Senate and was a Republican.

He died in Fond du Lac or in Valders, Wisconsin.

References

1855 births
1920 deaths
People from Athens County, Ohio
People from Eden, Wisconsin
Businesspeople from Wisconsin
Farmers from Wisconsin
County officials in Wisconsin
Republican Party Wisconsin state senators
People from Fond du Lac, Wisconsin